

Events
November 30 – Luca Marenzio returns to Rome from Florence.
 The wedding of Duke Ferdinand I of Tuscany is celebrated with six staged intermezzi, featuring music by Emilio de' Cavalieri and Giovanni de' Bardi, which presaged the first operas, and were a formative influence on the Baroque style.
Tarquinia Molza is dismissed from the court of Duchess Margherita Gonzaga d'Este because of her affair with the composer Giaches de Wert.

Publications
 Costanzo Antegnati – Second book of masses for six and eight voices (Venice: Angelo Gardano)
 Ippolito Baccusi – Third book of masses for five and six voices (Venice: Ricciardo Amadino)
 Ludovico Balbi –  for five voices (Venice: Angelo Gardano), a collection of madrigals
 Girolamo Belli –  (Motets) for eight voices (Venice: Giacomo Vincenti)
 Giulio Belli – First book of madrigals for five and six voices (Venice: Angelo Gardano)
 William Byrd
 , Book 1, for five voices (London: Thomas East for William Byrd)
 Songs of Sundrie Natures for three, four, five, and six voices (London: Thomas East for William Byrd)
 Madrigals for six voices (London: Thomas East for William Byrd)
 Johannes Eccard –  (New Songs) for four and five voices (Königsberg: Georg Osterberger)
 Andrea Gabrieli
Third book of madrigals for five voices (Venice: Angelo Gardano), published posthumously, includes a few pieces by Giovanni Gabrieli
 for four voices (Venice: Angelo Gardano), published posthumously
 Jacobus Gallus
 (Moral Harmonies) for four voices, book one (Prague: Georg Nigrinus)
 (Prague: Georg Nigrinus), a funeral motet
 Ruggiero Giovannelli –  for four voices, book two (Venice: Angelo Gardano), a book of madrigals
 Francisco Guerrero
Second book of motets for four, five, six, and eight voices (Venice: Giacomo Vincenti)
 for three, four, and five voices (Venice: Giacomo Vincenti)
 Konrad Hagius –  for four voices (Dusseldorf: Albert Byuss), sets the translation by Kaspar Ulenberg
 Marc'Antonio Ingegneri –  for seven to sixteen voices with instruments (Venice: Angelo Gardano)
 Paolo Isnardi – First book of madrigals for six voices (Venice: Angelo Gardano)
 Giovanni de Macque – Second book of madrigals for six voices (Venice: Angelo Gardano)
 Jakob Paix – , a collection of keyboard arrangements of motets by various composers (Stuttgart, Bernhart Jobin)
 Giovanni Pierluigi da Palestrina – ... for four voices
 Giovanni Maria Papalia – First book of madrigals for five voices (Messina: Fausto Bufalini)
 Giovanni Tommaso Benedictis da Pascarola –  (Venice: Scipione Riccio)
 Andreas Pevernage – First book of chansons for five voices (Antwerp: Christophe Plantin)
 Salamone Rossi – a collection of 19 canzonette

Classical music
 Giulio Caccini –

Births
 bap. July 2 – Guilielmus Messaus, Flemish composer (d. 1640)
 date unknown – Giovanni Battista Fontana, violinist and composer (d. 1630)

Deaths
date unknown – Christian Hollander, kapellmeister at Oudenarde (born c.1510)
probable
Thomas Palfreyman, author and musician
Tansen, Hindustani composer and vocalist (born c.1493/1506)

 
Music
16th century in music
Music by year